Mattie Brice is an independent video game designer, critic, educator, and industry activist. Her games and writing focus on diversity initiatives in the games industry, discussing the perspective of marginalized minority voices to publications like Paste, Kotaku, and The Border House. Her games are freeware and do not require programming to create.

Life 
She graduated from Florida Atlantic University, with a Bachelor of Arts in English Literature, Creative Writing, Gender and Sexuality Studies and from New York University with a Masters of Arts. Her background is in media, teaching, and social justice advocacy.

Her game, Mainichi, role plays day-to-day life of a transgender person. It was exhibited at XYZ: Alternative Voices in Game Design in Museum of Design Atlanta, the first-ever exhibition that highlights the work of women as game designers and artists. It was also exhibited at Indiecade 2013. Her game helps create a notable presence for LGBT+ individuals in video games. Mattie also consults and speaks at gaming-related conferences like the Game Developers Conference, Indiecade, and the Queerness and Games Conference at the Berkeley Center for New Media. She was a consultant for Spirit AI software.

In 2013, she was on a panel about diversity in games, at IGDA Summit, and GDC. In 2014, she was appointed as a judge at  the Independent Games Festival, but was later removed from her role. In 2017, she was associate director of IndieCade.

She teaches gaming-related courses at different universities such as New York University and the School of Visual Arts in New York City.

Works

Publications and Contributions 
She is the author of the chapter "Play and Be Real about it: What Games Could Learn From Kink" in the book Queer Game Studies.

She was an interviewee for the chapter "Radical Play Through Vulnerability" in the book Queer Games Avant -Garde, and she was an interviewee for a chapter in Queer and Trans Artists of Color: Volume Two.

Further reading

References

External links 
 
 
 

Living people
American video game designers
Video game artists
Florida Atlantic University alumni
New York University alumni
Year of birth missing (living people)
Women video game designers